The 41st Military Airlift Squadron is an inactive United States Air Force unit. It was last assigned to the 437th Military Airlift Wing, Military Airlift Command, stationed at Charleston Air Force Base, South Carolina.

It was inactivated on 1 October 1991.

History
The unit was activated as the 41st Ferrying (later, Transport) Squadron at Accra, British Gold Coast (Ghana), West Africa, in Aug 1942. It ferried various aircraft, including A-20s, A-30s, B-17s, B-24s, B-25s, B-26s, B-34s, P-38s, P-40s, C-46s, and C-53s, to destinations in England, North Africa, the Middle East, Iran and India. It also provided a maintenance service for transient aircraft until inactivated on 30 September 1943.

The squadron was re-activated in July 1952 at Wheelus Field, Libya. It flew C-54s to Egypt, Saudi Arabia and Cyprus; it also operated the base transport control center. Nine months after activation, the 41st undertook transient maintenance. It ceased flying operations on 1 Apr 1954 to prepare for the move to the United States. By 13 Apr, it had completed the move to Charleston AFB, SC and made its first scheduled flight on 10 May. Over the next fourteen months, its C-54s flew to Goose Bay, Labrador; Torbay, Newfoundland; Port Lyautey, Morocco; Tripoli, Libya; England; West Germany; Thule, Greenland; Bermuda; the Azores and France.

The squadron converted to the C-121C between 15 September and 31 December 1955, and added destinations in the Caribbean and Central America to its operations. In November–December, it flew the first of many missions in support of the UN, transporting peace-keeping forces from Columbia and India to Beirut in Lebanon, to enforce a Middle East cease-fire between Egypt and Israel. The airlift of Hungarian refugees from West Germany to the United States in Dec 1956 was only one of many humanitarian missions flown.

In 1962 the 41st transferred its C-121s to Air National Guard units and received its first C-130E on 11 August. During the 1960s, the 41st Military Airlift Squadron annually flew airlift missions to the Antarctic in support of U.S. scientific bases there. In the spring of 1965, it helped airlift troops, equipment and supplies to the Dominican Republic in support of the U.S.-backed government. In May 1965, it flew the first airlift mission to Vietnam. Re-designated the 41st Airlift Squadron in January 1966, it converted to C-141 aircraft in February–May 1967, and expanded operations to destinations all over the world. Flights to Southeast Asia in support of combat operations became much more frequent, only ceasing with the withdrawal of the U.S. in January 1973. The squadron frequently flew support missions for presidential trips, including President Richard M. Nixon's visit to the People's Republic of China in February 1972.

The squadron participated in the airlift of military supplies to Israel during the Yom Kippur War in October–November 1973. It flew missions in support of the evacuation and resettlement of Southeast Asian refugees, as the Communists took over South Vietnam and Cambodia between April and June 1975. Between 23 and 29 Oct 1983, it airlifted replacement troops and equipment to Beirut after a terrorist attack on U.S. Marines' barracks killed 241 men. The 41st IBS provided airlift support for the Grenada operation from 24 Oct to 19 Dec 1983. In recent years, the squadron has participated regularly in tactical air-drop exercises with the Army, and provided support for the U.S. Navy as well.

It was inactivated in 1991 as part of the drawdown of the USAF after the end of the Cold War.

Lineage
 Established as 41st Ferrying Squadron on 1 August 1942
 Activated on 17 August 1942
 Re-designated: 41st Transport Squadron on 1 March 1943
 Disbanded on 30 September 1943
 Re-designated: 41st Air Transport Squadron and activated on 20 Jul 1952
 Re-designated: 41st Air Transport Squadron, Heavy on 13 Apr 1954
 Re-designated: 41st Military Airlift Squadron, Heavy on  8 January 1966
 Re-designated: 41st Military Airlift Squadron on  1 October 1985
 Inactivated on 1 October 1991

Assignments
 12th Ferrying (later, 12th Transport) Group, 17 Aug 1942-30 Sep 1943
 1603d Air Transport Wing, 20 Jul 1952
 1602d Air Transport Wing, 1 Jan 1953
 1608th Air Transport Group (later, 1608th Air Transport Group, Medium; 1608th Air transport Group, Heavy), 13 Apr 1954
 1608th Air Transport Wing, Heavy, 18 Jan 1963
 437th Military Airlift Wing, 8 Jan 1966-1 October 1991

Stations
 Accra Airfield, British Gold Coast, 17 Aug 1942-30 Sep 1943
 Wheelus Air Base, Libya, 20 Jul 1952-12 Apr 1954
 Charleston AFB, South Carolina, 13 Apr 1954-1 October 1991

Aircraft
 C-54 Skymaster, 1952–1955
 C-121 Constellation, 1955–1962
 C-130E Hercules, 1962–1967
 C-141 Starlifter, 1967–1991

References

 Mueller, Robert, Air Force Bases Volume I, Active Air Force Bases Within the United States of America on 17 September 1982, Office of Air Force History, 1989

041
041